Bartsia alpina is a species of perennial flowering plant, known by the common name alpine bartsia or velvetbells. It is found in the mountainous regions of Europe and also occurs in Iceland, Greenland and north‐eastern Canada.

Description
The stem is erect and sometimes branched, hairy and purple in colour. At the base of the plant, the leaves are green, but higher up they are tinged with purple. It is narrow at the base and has two lips, an obtuse upper lip and a smaller lower one, with three blunt, equal-sized lobes. It has four stamens fused to the corolla and two ovaries fused to the style. The fruit is an oval brown capsule.

Distribution and habitat
Bartsia alpina has a European Arctic-montane distribution, and is also known from North America. It occurs in the mountainous regions of northern Russia, Finland, Norway and Sweden, and in the Alps and other mountains in Central Europe, as far south as the Pyrenees and south‐west Bulgaria; it also occurs in Iceland, Greenland and north‐eastern Canada.

It has a very restricted distribution in the British Isles, occurring only in a few locations in upland areas in northern England, and in the central Scottish Highlands. It used to occur in damp pasture, in basic flushes and runnels and wet, steep, species-rich banks, but it has largely been eliminated from these habitats by over-grazing and trampling by livestock. It has persisted better away from grazing animals in ledge communities on mica-schist crags.

References

External links
 
 
 Botanical Society of Britain and Ireland
 USDA Plant Classification

alpina
Plants described in 1753
Taxa named by Carl Linnaeus
Parasitic plants